Khirbat Umm Burj was a Palestinian Arab village in the Hebron Subdistrict, sometimes designated in modern maps as Burgin. Its ruins are today located within the borders of Israel. It was depopulated during the 1948 Arab–Israeli War on October 28, 1948, during the third stage of Operation Yo'av under the command of Yigal Allon. The site is located 17 km northwest of Hebron.

History
The site was occupied from the Iron Age.  A large ancient necropolis was here, including a church or synagogue, residential buildings and numerous agricultural installations. Israeli archaeologists, Amir Ganor and Boaz Zissu, think that Umm Burj may be a corruption of the 1st-century Jewish village, Kefar Bish, a view earlier rejected by Klein who said that Kefar Bish still bears its namesake in the nearby ruin of Khirbet al-Bis. A Jewish inscription, possibly dating from the Bar Kokhba revolt, has been found in a hiding complex at the site; it mentions a "Shelamzion daughter of...".

In the late 19th century, extensive Christian remains were noted in the area surrounding Umm Burj. Finnish scholar, Aapeli Saarisalo, visited the site of Umm Burj in the early 20th-century, and described its ruins as being of Byzantine and Arab origin.

Late Ottoman period
In 1838 Um Burj was noted as village, located in the area between the mountains and  Gaza, but subject to the government of el-Khulil.

In 1863, Victor Guérin passed north of Khirbat Umm Burj, and described the village as being on a mountain,  dominating the surroundings.

An  Ottoman   village list from about  1870  found that  um-burdsch had  a population of 150, in  25  houses, though the population count included men, only.

French orientalist and archaeologist, Charles Clermont-Ganneau, visited the site in 1874 where he noticed a well situated nearby, called Bîr Hârûn, surmounted with a rude structure, near which were troughs hollowed out in large stone blocks.

In 1883,  the PEF's Survey of Western Palestine (SWP)  described  Umm Burj as: "A ruined village, with a central tower; apparently not ancient; caves and cisterns round it, and a well."   Khalidi believed that the SWP assumption that the tower was not ancient might have been wrong.

British Mandate  period
In the 1931 census of Palestine, Umm Burj and Sanabra, listed in the sub-district of Hebron, had a joint population of 119 Muslims, in a total of 26 houses. 

In the 1945 statistics  it had a population of 140 Muslims,  with a total of 13,083  dunums of land.

The villagers used to obtain drinking water from three wells on the northern outskirts of the village.

1948 and aftermath
After the 1948 Arab–Israeli War, the ruin of Umm Burj came under Israeli control under the terms of the 1949 Armistice Agreements between Israel and Jordan. Today, the site lies in the Adullam-France Park.

The moshav of Nehusha was established in 1955 on land that had belonged to the village, west of the village site, but collapsed in 1968. It was re-established in 1981.

Archaeology

In the years 1995–2012, archaeological fieldwork was conducted by a team of archaeologists at Khirbet Umm Burj on behalf of the Israel Antiquities Authority (IAA), among whom were Boaz Zissu and Amir Golan, et al., where they uncovered at the site two Byzantine churches, and a Jewish inscription incised on a doorjamb of an underground room in a hiding tunnel system.

Gallery

References

Bibliography

External links
Welcome To Umm Burj, Khirbat
 Khirbat Umm Burj,  Zochrot
Khirbat Umm Burj (Burgin)
Survey of Western Palestine, Map 21:  IAA, Wikimedia commons 
Umm Burj, Khirbat, from the Khalil Sakakini Cultural Center
 All About... Khirbat Umm Burj, from  Zochrot
 Tour to Umm Burj 
Remembering Umm Burj, Umm Burj booklet, 08/2008

Arab villages depopulated during the 1948 Arab–Israeli War
District of Hebron
Archaeological sites in Israel